Esa Lehikoinen (born April 17, 1986) is a Finnish professional ice hockey defenceman. He played with BK Mladá Boleslav in the Czech Extraliga during the 2010–11 Czech Extraliga season.

References

External links

1986 births
Living people
BK Mladá Boleslav players
Finnish ice hockey defencemen
People from Joensuu
Sportspeople from North Karelia
Jokipojat players
Rote Teufel Bad Nauheim players
Kassel Huskies players
KooKoo players
Lukko players
Vaasan Sport players
Finnish expatriate ice hockey players in the Czech Republic
Finnish expatriate ice hockey players in Germany